Between 1978 and 2000, a number of detention centres were formed by the Corrections Department in Hong Kong for the internment of Vietnamese refugees. As the government of Hong Kong took more actions against the refugees, tightened restrictions and deporting them to Vietnam, the centres were depopulated and disestablished over time.

CSD's Vietnamese Migrants Detention Centres (VMDCs) refer to some of the camps for Vietnamese migrants set up by the Hong Kong Correctional Services Department (CSD) throughout the territory between the 1970s and 1990s in response to the Vietnamese migrant problem in Hong Kong. Since 1978, when the Prison Department, the predecessor of the CSD, established its first detention centre near Kai Tak Airport in Kowloon, the Department has been working with other agencies to receive VBP, and at one time set up a Refugee Unit and recruited additional temporary staff to participate in management matters. The last detention centre near the High Island Reservoir in Sai Kung was closed in 1998, bringing an end to the CSD's Vietnamese boat service.

History
The first Vietnamese refugees arrived on the same day of the fall of Saigon, and in 1979 there was another wave of Chinese exclusion in Vietnam, causing a large number of Vietnamese boat people to flee to other parts of Asia, with some 203,000 people smuggled by boat to the Pearl River Delta in the last 20 years alone. In 1978, the Government decided to convert the former Royal Air Force Base into the Kai Tak Refugee Camp and let the Prison Department take over, and since then it has been involved in the management of Vietnamese migrants. In the same year, the Prison Department cleared the inmates of the Ma Po Ping Addiction Treatment Centre in Tong Fuk, Lantau Island, and opened an additional camp.

A record number of 70,000 refugees arrived the next year, including 2,700 who had been on the Skyluck and ran it aground, adding to the issue. As more refugees streamed in, the Hong Kong government converted prisons and barracks to refugee camps. In 1982, the Hong Kong government changed its mind and stipulated that boat people who entered Hong Kong after July 1 of that year must enter a closed camp. Those who stayed in the camp were not allowed to go out or leave the camp to work. The Education Department immediately converted some prisons into closed camps. In the same year, the Correctional Services Department established the Refugee Unit and began recruiting contractual temporary staff to assist existing correctional staff to share management tasks. These employees received a two-week intensive training course on immigration regulations, camp regulations, marching and crowd management skills, and the Vietnamese language. By the end of 1998, 1,813 temporary staff were hired. The adoption of the Comprehensive Plan of Action led to more stringent checks on migrants and more deportations back to their home countries or repatriation to other states more willing to accept refugees.

As Hong Kong was a "port of first asylum," the number of boat people in Hong Kong continued to increase in the 1980s with around 20,000 to 30,000 new arrivals every year causing the Correctional Services Department detention centres to fill up. As a result, the Department has to continue to set up detention centres and even designate the industrial buildings in Tuen Mun as temporary accommodation for boat people to meet their urgent needs. In 1988, the Government abolished the closed-camp policy and replaced it with a screening policy leading to the CSD creating the post of "Assistant Commissioner (Vietnamese Shipping Services)". On the other hand, the Hong Kong Government has instead set up large detention centres at Whitehead in Ma On Shan and High Island Reservoir in Sai Kung to accommodate the large number of boat people.

In the 1990s, the Hong Kong Government began to carry out orderly repatriation operations to ensure the safe return of the boat people to Vietnam, which led to a decline in the number of boat people in Hong Kong. It was second only to the 1991 riots at Sek Kong that left 24 refugees dead. The repatriation process proceeded smoothly and the detention centres were gradually closed and restored to their original correctional use. The 'Assistant Director (Vietnamese Boat Service)' position was abolished by 1997 and in 1998, the Sai Kung High Island Detention Centre was officially closed, ending the Correctional Services Department's Vietnamese boat service.

List

Hong Kong Island

Kowloon

New Territories

See also
 Vietnamese people in Hong Kong

References

Detention centers
Refugees in Hong Kong
Vietnamese refugees